Danan is a sub-district located in Al Ashah District, 'Amran Governorate, Yemen. Danan had a population of 3,190 according to the 2004 census.

References 

Sub-districts in Al Ashah District